Wolfgang Menge (10 April 1924 – 17 October 2012) was a German television writer and journalist.

Life 
Menge worked as television writer and journalist in Germany. He was married and had three sons.

Filmography 

Literature:
Book: Ganz einfach – chinesisch in der Rowohlt Reihe: Koche froh mit rororo, 1968, 580-

External links 

 
 
 Wolfgang Menge, krimilexikon.de
 „Kinojahre eines Televisionärs. Wolfgang Menge zum 85. Geburtstag“, film-dienst, 2009, Porträt von Gundolf Freyermuth
 Zum Tod von Wolfgang Menge: Der Fernsehriese, FAZ.Net, 18. October 2012

Interviews
 „Ab 20:15 Uhr läuft im TV nur dummes Zeug“, Die Welt, 23. January 2007
 Wolfgang Menge: „Wahnsinnig witzig, kann ich Ihnen sagen“, Der Tagesspiegel, July 2009
 „Wann ist ein Mann ein Mann“, Berliner Zeitung, 27. May 2000, Rolf Eden in interview with Wolfgang Menge

References 

German journalists
German male journalists
1924 births
2012 deaths
German male writers
German screenwriters
German male screenwriters
German television writers
Male television writers
Radio Bremen people
Mass media people from Hamburg
Burials at the Waldfriedhof Zehlendorf